Ambos Camarines's at-large congressional district may refer to one occasion when a provincewide at-large district was used in an election to a Philippine national legislature from the historical province of Ambos Camarines. The former province was represented by four representatives in the National Assembly of the First Philippine Republic in 1898 following its reorganization under Article 6 of the Decreto de 18 junio de 1898 y las instrucciones sobre el régimen de las provincias y pueblos. It elected two members to the nascent Malolos Congress with two more members having been appointed by the same congress. The district was abolished after the fall of the First Republic and the start of American rule in 1901. Ambos Camarines was immediately reestablished as a province in the same year and elected its representatives to the Philippine Assembly from three congressional districts created under the Philippine Commission Act No. 1582 on January 9, 1907.

Representation history

See also
Legislative districts of Camarines Norte
Legislative districts of Camarines Sur

References

Former congressional districts of the Philippines
Politics of Camarines Norte
Politics of Camarines Sur
1898 establishments in the Philippines
1901 disestablishments in the Philippines
At-large congressional districts of the Philippines
Congressional districts of the Bicol Region
Constituencies established in 1898
Constituencies disestablished in 1901